Plexippus fuscus is a species of jumping spider in the genus Plexippus that lives in Guinea. The female was first described in 2002.

References

Fauna of Guinea
Salticidae
Spiders described in 2002
Spiders of Africa
Taxa named by Wanda Wesołowska